Tomás Blanco (born 17 March 1999) is an Argentine professional footballer who plays as a forward for Quilmes.

Career
Blanco's career in senior football began with Quilmes, after joining their academy in 2014 following stints with local teams Ferrocarril Chajarí and Tiro Federal Chajarí. He was moved into the first-team by Marcelo Fuentes at the beginning of the 2018–19 Primera B Nacional campaign, making his professional debut against Atlético de Rafaela on 27 August 2018 at the Estadio Nuevo Monumental. His first goal arrived in his fifth appearance in September versus Platense, with his second coming in October during an away draw with Villa Dálmine.

Career statistics
.

References

External links

1999 births
Living people
People from Federación Department
Argentine footballers
Association football forwards
Primera Nacional players
Quilmes Atlético Club footballers
Sportspeople from Entre Ríos Province